Christiansburg is an unincorporated community in Van Buren Township, Brown County, in the U.S. state of Indiana.

History
Christiansburg was founded about 1850. It may have been named for Col. William Christian. The Christiansburg post office was discontinued in 1902.

Geography

References

Unincorporated communities in Brown County, Indiana
Unincorporated communities in Indiana